Michael Angelo Taylor (1757 – 16 July 1834) was an English politician and MP for Poole. He favored parliamentary reform and was made a privy councillor in 1831.

Life
He was a son of Sir Robert Taylor (1714–1788), the architect, and his wife Elizabeth, and was educated at Corpus Christi College, Oxford, becoming a barrister at Lincoln's Inn in 1774. He entered the House of Commons as Member of Parliament (MP) for Poole in 1784, and, with the exception of the short period from 1802 to 1806, remained a member of parliament until 1834, although not as the representative of the same constituency.

In Parliament Taylor showed himself anxious to curtail the delays in the Court of Chancery, and to improve the lighting and paving of the London streets; and he was largely instrumental in bringing about the abolition of the pillory. At first a supporter of the younger Pitt, he soon veered round to the side of Fox and the Whigs, favored parliamentary reform, and was a personal friend of the regent, afterwards King George IV. He was on the committee which managed the Impeachment of Warren Hastings; was made a  privy councillor in 1831; and died in London in July 1834.

Taylor is chiefly known in connection with the Metropolitan Paving Act 1817, which is still referred to as "Michael Angelo Taylor's Act." Often called "Chicken Taylor" because of his reference to himself as a "mere chicken in the law," he is described by Sir Spencer Walpole as "a pompous barrister, with a little body and a loud voice."

Michael Angelo challenged a codicil to his father's will, left unsigned when Sir Robert died in 1788, by means of which Sir Robert intended to gift £65,000 to the University of Oxford. The University did not receive the money, with which it built the Taylor Institution, until 1835, a year after Michael Angelo's own death.

Notes

References

External links 
 

1757 births
1834 deaths
Alumni of Corpus Christi College, Oxford
Members of Lincoln's Inn
Members of the Parliament of Great Britain for City of Durham
British MPs 1784–1790
British MPs 1790–1796
British MPs 1796–1800
Members of the Parliament of the United Kingdom for City of Durham
UK MPs 1801–1802
UK MPs 1806–1807
UK MPs 1807–1812
UK MPs 1812–1818
UK MPs 1818–1820
UK MPs 1820–1826
UK MPs 1826–1830
UK MPs 1830–1831
UK MPs 1832–1835
Members of the Privy Council of the United Kingdom